The Aglia is a  long stream in the department of Haute-Corse, Corsica, a tributary of the Abatesco.

History

Some historians say there may have been a town called Aglia along the stream of that name.
The stream gives its name to the prehistoric site of Aglia in Serra-di-Fiumorbo (Sarra di Fiumorbu).
When the railway line was being built in 1927 a prehistoric necropolis, known as Aglia, was uncovered at a place called Nodo.
It has many tombs, each covered by a curved slab, which are arranged in groups.
The skeletons are accompanied by stone axes, arrowheads and spears, and some have arrangements of small multi-colored pebbles and fragments of quartz.

Geography

The Aglia is one of the three main tributaries of the Abatesco, the others being the Buva and the Biaccino.
It rises in Ventiseri to the east of Punta di Quarcio Grosso, a  peak.
It flows for  through Serra-di-Fiumorbo in a northeast direction to join the Abatesco to the south of Morta. 
The stream has no named tributaries.
It crosses the communes of Prunelli-di-Fiumorbo, Serra-di-Fiumorbo and Ventiseri.

A local road running west from Pont de l'Abatesco to the D545 crosses the stream at Tozzi and then follows it upstream to a point just north of Pont du Nodo where the D545 crosses the stream.
The Pont du Nodo was formerly a bridge on the Côte orientale corse railway line, and has particularly well-preserved masonry.

Notes

Sources

Rivers of Haute-Corse
Rivers of France
Coastal basins of the Tyrrhenian Sea in Corsica